Werner Aderhold (4 November 1937 – 15 February 2021) was a German musicologist.

Life 
Born in Dortmund, Aderhold was a long-time collaborator of the New Schubert Edition at the Eberhard Karls University of Tübingen. Initially, he contributed to the revised new edition of the Deutsch-Verzeichniss in German (1978). Later, he primarily edited Schubert's instrumental works, including string quartets as well as the great symphonies in B minor and C major.

Aderhold also compiled a series of editions for the Carus-Verlag.

Publications 
 (as co-editor): Otto Erich Deutsch, Franz Schubert. Thematisches Verzeichnis seiner Werke in chronologischer Folge. New edition in German (together with Arnold Feil, Walther Dürr), Kassel 1978
 (as co-editor) with Walther Dürr and Walburga Litschauer: Franz Schubert. Jahre der Krise 1818–1823. Arnold Feil on his 60th birthday  (Kongreßbericht Kassel 1982), Kassel 1985.

References

External links 
 
 
 

German musicologists
Schubert scholars
1937 births
2021 deaths
People from Dortmund